UGM Campus Mosque is a mosque owned by Universitas Gadjah Mada (UGM) and located within its campus in Sleman, Special Region of Yogyakarta, Indonesia. It is one of the largest mosques in Southeast Asia in terms of capacity.

Construction 
The mosque's construction began on May 21, 1998 on the grounds of a former Chinese cemetery. The construction was done entirely by the students of UGM Architecture Engineering department in order to complete the construction cost within 9.5 billion rupiah. It was inaugurated on December 4, 1999.

Architecture 
From the architectural perspective, UGM Campus Mosque is a blend of architectural style of Al-Masjid an-Nabawi in Medina, Chinese, Indian and Javanese. In the courtyard there is a pool inspired by the one in Taj Mahal.

Access 
UGM Campus Mosque can be reached by Trans Jogja Line 4A and 4B.

Gallery

References

External links 

 Official website
 Wikimapia
 Photo gallery on Foursquare

Buildings and structures in the Special Region of Yogyakarta
Javanese architecture
Mosques completed in 1999
Mosques in Indonesia
1999 establishments in Indonesia
Gadjah Mada University